David Maclain Hale (born 1961) is an American diplomat and career ambassador, who previously served as the United States Under Secretary of State for Political Affairs. He is currently a Distinguished Diplomatic Fellow at the Wilson Center, on detail from the Department of State.

Early life
David Hale was born in Ann Arbor, Michigan in 1961 and lives in New Jersey. He graduated from Georgetown University's School of Foreign Service in 1983.

Career
Hale joined the Foreign Service in 1985. He served at the United States missions to Tunisia, Bahrain, Saudi Arabia, and the United Nations. In Washington, Hale was Deputy Assistant Secretary of State for Israel, Egypt and the Levant and Director for Israel-Palestinian Affairs. He held several staff posts, including Executive Assistant to Secretary of State Albright.

Hale was United States Ambassador to the Hashemite Kingdom of Jordan between 2005 and 2008. He was Deputy Envoy from 2009 to 2012, and Special Envoy for Middle East Peace between 2011 and 2013. He served as the United States Ambassador to Lebanon from 2013 to 2015.

Hale was the United States Ambassador to Pakistan from August 5, 2015 to August 30, 2018. In May 2017, he dedicated a new Counter-Terrorism Department building in Karachi. The building, which had been bombed in 2010, was rebuilt at a cost of 24 million Pakistani rupees contributed from the United States Department of State's Bureau of International Narcotics and Law Enforcement Affairs.

Hale is the recipient of several Department Superior and Meritorious Honor awards, including the Secretary's Distinguished Service Award in 2013.

In July 2018, President Donald Trump announced his intention to nominate Hale as the next Under Secretary of State for Political Affairs. During the Legislative day of August 28, 2018, he was confirmed by a voice vote.

On September 13, 2018, Hale was promoted to the rank of Career Ambassador – the highest rank in the foreign service. He was formerly the highest-ranked serving United States Foreign Service Officer.

Service as Under Secretary 
In early 2020, Under Secretary Hale visited West Africa to advance US diplomatic interests in the Sahel.

In September 2020, Hale testified that a potential sale of F-35 fighter aircraft to the United Arab Emirates would be discussed with Israel in light of US policy goals to maintain an advantage for Israel in the area.

In 2021, Victoria Nuland was nominated by President Joe Biden to serve as Under Secretary for Political Affairs in the new administration. Hale consequently stepped down from the position and was detailed to the Wilson Center, a policy think-tank based in Washington D.C, as a Distinguished Diplomatic Fellow. He remains an active-duty U.S. Foreign Service Officer. Upon his resignation as Under Secretary, he ceded his status as the highest-ranking U.S. Foreign Service Officer, a position held by the officer serving in the highest political appointment in the Department (usually Deputy Secretary or Under Secretary for Political Affairs) irrespective of years of service.

Testifying in impeachment inquiry 

Hale appeared before House investigators on November 6, 2019 with regard to the impeachment inquiry. Hale came to the attention of the impeachment inquiry when Philip Reeker testified about support for Ambassador Marie Yovanovitch being suppressed after President Donald Trump had her removed as ambassador to Ukraine. Mr. Reeker's deputy, George P. Kent, voiced misgivings about Rudy Giuliani’s role in Ukraine matters to Reeker and Hale, according to documents from the State Department's inspector general.

On November 20, 2019, Hale testified that an Office of Management and Budget (OMB) official informed him that Trump ordered aid to be withheld from Ukraine.

See also

List of ambassadors of the United States

References

External links

 Deposition Nov. 6, 2019

|-

|-

|-

|-

1962 births
Living people
Ambassadors of the United States to Jordan
Ambassadors of the United States to Lebanon
Ambassadors of the United States to Pakistan
People from New Jersey
Walsh School of Foreign Service alumni
United States Career Ambassadors
United States Foreign Service personnel
People from Ann Arbor, Michigan
20th-century American diplomats
21st-century American diplomats